Special Combat Unit (SCU) is a branch of Khyber Pakhtunkhwa Police trained as for counter-terrorism purposes capable of rapid deployment, it is operational in its jurisdiction of Khyber Pakhtunkhwa in Pakistan. The force can be deployed in any part of the province for sting operations, interdictions, counter-terrorism operations, airborne operations and amphibious operations both independently and in support of other police units or law enforcement agencies. 

The training of first contingent of 150 personnel begin on 13 May 2014.  A contingent of 32 women commandos, joined the force on 11 February 2015. By the end of 2015, the unit aims to have 1050 personal deployed in 12 stations across the province.

See also
List of Special Response Units
Elite Police Academy

References

Non-military counterterrorist organizations
Provincial law enforcement agencies of Pakistan
Police special forces of Pakistan
Organizations established in 2014
2014 establishments in Pakistan